Parviz Sorouri is an Iranian conservative politician who is a member of the City Council of Tehran. He represented Tehran, Rey, Shemiranat and Eslamshahr electoral district in the Islamic Consultative Assembly for two terms.

References
 Biography

Living people
People from Hamadan
1960 births
Members of the 7th Islamic Consultative Assembly
Members of the 8th Islamic Consultative Assembly
Tehran Councillors 2013–2017
Society of Pathseekers of the Islamic Revolution politicians
Alliance of Builders of Islamic Iran politicians
Popular Front of Islamic Revolution Forces politicians
Secretaries-General of political parties in Iran
Islamic Revolutionary Guard Corps personnel of the Iran–Iraq War
Vice Chairmen of City Council of Tehran